JESC may refer to:

 Junior Eurovision Song Contest
 Jesuit European Social Centre